Alfonso “Al” Marina (August 5, 1930 - May 27, 2004) was an American soccer player who spent his career in the American Soccer League, earned one cap with the U.S. national team, and was a member of the 1956 Olympic soccer team.

Marina earned one cap with the U.S. national team in a 3-2 loss to Iceland on August 25, 1955.  Marina was then selected for the 1956 U.S. Olympic soccer team.  The U.S. had a successful tour of Asia before the games, winning five and losing three.  However, the games proved anticlimactic when the U.S. lost, 9-1, to Yugoslavia in the first round.  At the time of the games, he played for Brooklyn Hispano in the American Soccer League.

References

External links
 
 

American soccer players
American Soccer League (1933–1983) players
Brooklyn Hispano players
Olympic soccer players of the United States
Footballers at the 1956 Summer Olympics
United States men's international soccer players
Living people
Association football defenders
1930 births